The Arizona Canal is a major canal in central Maricopa County that led to the founding of several communities, now among the wealthier neighborhoods of suburban Phoenix, constructed in the late 1880s. Flood irrigation of residential yards is still common in these neighborhoods, using a system of lateral waterways connected via gates to the canal itself. Like most Valley canals, its banks are popular with joggers and bicyclists.

Beginning at Granite Reef Diversion Dam, northeast of Mesa, it flows west across the Salt River Pima-Maricopa Indian Community, downtown Scottsdale, Phoenix's Arcadia and Sunnyslope neighborhoods, Glendale, and Peoria before ending at New River near Arrowhead Towne Center.

History
William John Murphy was hired in 1883 to spearhead its construction, which was completed in May 1885. He then founded Glendale; its downtown Murphy Park is named for him. Nearby Peoria was also founded within the decade.

Several miles upstream (east),  on the canal's south side were purchased in 1888 by a former Civil War chaplain, Major Winfield Scott, establishing what is now Scottsdale. Murphy later built the Ingleside Club hotel near Scottsdale (in what is now Arcadia), laying the foundation for the area's vital tourism economy. Several resorts – The Phoenician, Biltmore, Royal Palms, a Pointe Hilton and a Ritz-Carlton – were all built close to the canal between 1929 and 1988. Also, five shopping malls of varying size and affluence – Borgata, Scottsdale Fashion Square, Biltmore Fashion Park, Metrocenter Mall and Arrowhead Towne Center – now reside along the canal's route.  Five miles were added to the canal's western end in 1894, completing its  length.

A 750-kilowatt restored hydroelectric plant and art display opened in June 2003 in Arcadia, at a natural  drop called Arizona Falls.

Scottsdale's Waterfront Project is aimed at revitalizing an area along the Arizona Canal just west of Scottsdale Road. The City of Scottsdale and the Scottsdale Public Art board engaged the architect Paolo Soleri who designed a bridge over the Arizona Canal in Downtown Scottsdale. The suspension bridge has two steel-clad, 64-foot pylons create a light beam on the walking surface to mark solar events. The bridge will direct pedestrians, bicyclists, and horse riders moving north and south along the Arizona Canal system.

See also
 List of rivers of Arizona

References

External links

History of the Arizona Canal and other canals in the system, on the site of the Salt River Project
The Waterfront Project, along the Arizona Canal in Scottsdale, on the site of Scottsdale Public Art

Buildings and structures in Maricopa County, Arizona
Canals in Arizona
Canals opened in 1885
Historic American Engineering Record in Arizona
Transportation in Maricopa County, Arizona
1885 establishments in Arizona Territory